The XE-class submarines were a series of twelve midget submarines that were built for the Royal Navy during 1944; four more to a slightly different design were built 1954-5 as the Stickleback class. They were an improved version of the  used in the attack on the German battleship .

They carried a crew of four, typically a lieutenant in command, with a sub-lieutenant as deputy, an engine room artificer in charge of the mechanical side and a seaman or leading-seaman. At least one of them was qualified as a diver.

In addition to the two side charges (each of which contained two tons of amatol explosive), they carried around six  limpet mines which were attached to the target by the diver.

They and their depot ship  arrived at Labuan in July 1945. Four of them managed to take part in operations before the war ended.

Operations Sabre and Foil 

These operations, carried out in July 1945, were intended to cut the undersea telephone cables connecting Singapore, Saigon, Hong Kong and Tokyo. The intention was to oblige the Japanese to use radio and render themselves open to message interception.

Operation Sabre was directed at the Hong Kong to Saigon telephone cable, and carried out by XE4, which was towed to within  of the Mekong Delta by the submarine HMS Spearhead, where she looked for the two telephone cables by using a towed grapnel. XE4's diver, Sub-Lieutenant K.M. Briggs, used the net/cable cutter to sever it. The second cable was soon found as well, and was severed by the second diver, Sub-Lieutenant A. Bergius. XE4 and Spearhead returned to Labuan on 3 August 1945.

Operation Foil was directed at the Hong Kong to Singapore telephone cable and carried out by XE5 against the Hong Kong end of the cable, after being towed into position by the submarine HMS Selene. Operating close inshore near to Lamma Island, working conditions were poor, XE5's divers having to work in thick mud under the constant threat of oxygen poisoning. Despite repeated attempts it was not completely certain that the cable had in fact been severed, and it was not until after the Japanese surrender that it was confirmed that XE5 had succeeded in doing so. XE5 and Selene returned to Subic Bay on 6 August 1945.

Operation Struggle
In August 1945, HMS XE1 and XE3 executed a joint attack on Japanese warships within Singapore harbour. XE3 was tasked with mining the heavy cruiser Takao while XE1 was to attack the heavy cruiser Myōkō.

The approach of XE3 along the Straits of Johor and through the various harbour defences took 11 hours plus a further two hours to locate the camouflaged target. Despite several opportunities for Japanese defenders to spot the vessel, XE3 successfully reached the Takao, fixed limpet mines and dropped its two, 2-ton side charges. The withdrawal was successfully made and XE3 returned to HMS Stygian, her towing submarine. Meanwhile, XE1 was delayed by Japanese patrol craft, and her captain, realizing that he could not reach Myōkō (which was two miles further into the harbour than Takao) before the mines already laid by XE3 would explode, also elected to drop his own charges under Takao. XE1 also successfully returned to her towing submarine, HMS Spark.

The Takao, already damaged and not seaworthy, was severely damaged and never sailed again. XE3s commander, Lieutenant Ian Edward Fraser RNR, and diver Leading Seaman James Joseph Magennis were awarded the Victoria Cross (VC) for their part in the attack; whilst Sub-Lieutenant William James Lanyon Smith, RNZNVR, who was at the controls of XE3, received the Distinguished Service Order (DSO); Engine Room Artificer Third Class Charles Alfred Reed, who was at the wheel, received the Conspicuous Gallantry Medal (CGM). XE1'''s C/O, Lieutenant John Elliott Smart RNVR received the DSO, and Sub-Lieutenant Harold Edwin Harper, RNVR received the Distinguished Service Cross (DSC); and ERA Fourth Class Henry James Fishleigh and Leading Seaman Walter Henry Arthur Pomeroy received the Distinguished Service Medal. ERA Fourth Class Albert Nairn, Acting Leading Stoker Jack Gordan Robinson, and Able Seaman Ernest Raymond Dee were Mentioned in Despatches for their part in bringing the two midget submarines from harbour to the point where the crews that took part in the attack took over.

List of  XE Craft

First group
 XE1 — built by Thomas Broadbent and Sons, used in Operation Struggle, scrapped 1945
 XE2 — built by Thomas Broadbent and Sons, scrapped 1945
 XE3 — built by Thomas Broadbent and Sons, used in Operation Struggle, scrapped 1945
 XE4 "Exciter" — built by Thomas Broadbent and Sons, used in Operation Sabre, scrapped 1945
 XE5 — built by Thomas Broadbent and Sons, used in Operation Foil, scrapped 1945
 XE6 — built by Thomas Broadbent and Sons, scrapped 1945
 XE7 — built by Thomas Broadbent and Sons, scrapped 1952
 XE8 "Expunger" — built by Broadbent, sunk as target 1952, recovered 1973 and preserved at Chatham Historic Dockyard, on loan from the Imperial War Museum
 XE9 — built by Markham, scrapped 1952
 XE10 — built by Markham, cancelled incomplete 1945
Second group
 XE11 — built by Marshall, collided with boom defence vessel in Loch Striven after drifting out of her exercise area and lost 6 March 1945. Three crew were killed in the accident but two managed to escape. The boat was later salvaged.
 XE12 — built by Marshall, cannibalised for spares 1952
Third group

with minor improvements, built 1954-5. See
 X51 Stickleback - to Swedish Navy as Spiggen.  Now on display at Scottish Submarine Heritage Centre, Helensburgh.
 X52 Shrimp X53 Sprat - to United States Navy
 X54 MinnowIn popular culture

Author Douglas Reeman featured XE craft in two of his novels, the 1961 Dive in the Sun and Surface with Daring published in 1976.

References

Bibliography
 Submarines in Colour by Bill Gunston - Blandford Colour Series - Blandford - 1976 - 
 Submarines - The History and Evolution of Underwater Fighting Vessels by Anthony Preston - Octopus Books - 1974 - 
 The Sea Devils: Operation Struggle and the Last Great Raid of World War Two'' by Mark Felton - Icon Books - 2015 - 

Submarine classes
 
Midget submarines